Jang Sang-Won (born September 30, 1977) is a South Korean football player.
His previous club is Ulsan Hyundai, Daegu FC.

External links 

1977 births
Living people
Association football defenders
South Korean footballers
Ulsan Hyundai FC players
Daegu FC players
K League 1 players